Juan Luis Wood (born: 29 March 1974) is a sailor from Las Palmas de Gran Canaria, Spain. World champion junior 1991 and 1992 in 470 class with Luis Martínez Doreste, and represented his country at the 2000 Summer Olympics in Sydney, Australia as crew member in the Soling. With helmsman Manuel Doreste and fellow crew member Domingo Manrique they took the 16th place.

References

Living people
1974 births
Sailors at the 2000 Summer Olympics – Soling
Olympic sailors of Spain
Sportspeople from Las Palmas
Spanish male sailors (sport)